The 1976 United States presidential election in New Mexico took place on November 2, 1976. All fifty states and The District of Columbia were part of the 1976 United States presidential election. State voters chose four electors to represent them in the Electoral College, who voted for president and vice president.

New Mexico was won by President Gerald Ford by a 2-point lead. A very partisan election in New Mexico, only one percent of the electorate voted for third-party candidates. While Ford took the State of New Mexico, and much of the American Southwest and Midwest, Georgia Governor Jimmy Carter won the electoral college with 297 votes, and was elected president.

A reliable bellwether state in presidential elections up to this point, this was the first election since gaining statehood that New Mexico did not back the winning presidential candidate, and the only time, as of 2020, that New Mexico did not back the national popular-vote winner (in 2000 and 2016, it voted for the candidate who won the popular vote but not the electoral vote). It is also the only election a Democrat has won while losing New Mexico. , this is the last election in which Torrance County and Quay County voted for a Democratic presidential candidate.

Results

Results by county

References

New Mexico
1976
1976 New Mexico elections